The year 1713 in architecture involved some significant events.

Events
 February 25 – Death of Frederick I of Prussia pauses work on Charlottenburg Palace in Berlin.

Buildings and structures

Buildings

 Old State House (Boston) in Massachusetts, possibly designed by Robert Twelves, is completed.
 Church of San Benedetto, Catania in Sicily is completed.
 Spandauische Kirche, Berlin, designed by Philipp Gerlach, is consecrated.
 Schelf Church at Schwerin in the Duchy of Mecklenburg-Schwerin, is rebuilt.
 Vizianagaram fort in South India is built.

Births
 January 22 – Marc-Antoine Laugier, French architectural historian (died 1769)
 July 18 – Gaetano Matteo Pisoni, Ticinese architect (died 1782)
 July 22 – Jacques-Germain Soufflot, French neoclassical architect (died 1780)
 October 30 – Giuseppe Antonio Landi, Bolognese neoclassical architect and ceiling painter working in Brazil (died 1791)
 December 27 – Giovanni Battista Borra, Italian architect and engineer (died 1770)
 John Gwynn, English architect (died 1786)
 Ivan Hryhorovych-Barskyi, Ukrainian baroque architect (died 1785)
 James "Athenian" Stuart, English neoclassical architect and painter (died 1788)

Deaths
 September 9 – Giovanni Antonio Viscardi, Swiss baroque architect working in Bavaria (born 1645)
 Antonio Riva, Rhaetian baroque architect and builder (born 1650)

References

architecture
Years in architecture
18th-century architecture